Cyperus commixtus is a species of sedge that is endemic to a small area of eastern Africa.

The species was first formally described by the botanist Georg Kükenthal in 1931.

See also
 List of Cyperus species

References

commixtus
Plants described in 1931
Taxa named by Georg Kükenthal
Flora of Sudan
Flora of Somalia